The Silver Logie Most Popular Drama Program is an award presented annually at the Australian TV Week Logie Awards. It recognises the popularity of an Australian drama production.

It was first awarded at the 19th Annual TV Week Logie Awards, held in 1977 when it was originally called Most Popular Australian Drama. This award category was eliminated in 1989 when the category Most Popular Series replaced it, but was reintroduced in 1991, only to be eliminated again the following year for that alternative category name. It returned in 1994 for three years alongside that other category. After a seven-year absence, the category was reintroduced in 2004.

Over the years, it has been known as Most Popular Drama (1978, 1986, 1988), Most Popular Drama Series (1979–1984, 1987, 1991, 2008–2013), Most Popular Drama Program (1985, 2014–15), Most Popular Australian Drama Series (2004–2005)  and Best Drama Program (2016-2017). From 2018, the award category name was reverted to Most Popular Drama Program.

The winner and nominees of Most Popular Drama Program are chosen by the public through an online voting survey on the TV Week website. Home and Away holds the record for the most wins, with eight, followed by Packed to the Rafters with four wins.

Winners and nominees

Multiple wins

See also
Logie Award for Most Popular Australian Program

References

Awards established in 1977